

Run Hard Music

Run Hard Music LLC and its parent company Run Hard Media are multimedia production companies based out of Philadelphia PA. RHM was founded in 2001 by brothers Michael and Patrick Maley of the music group SIRIS in an effort to promote and produce independent music. Since its founding, RHM has expanded operations to include multimedia production services that include video and music production.

Artists
SIRIS
Tim Kraus

See also
 List of record labels

External links
 Official site

American independent record labels